Ian Isaac Rosenblatt  (born 2 November 1959) is a British lawyer, senior partner of the business law firm Rosenblatt Group plc, and a supporter of charitable causes, notably in the field of classical music. He founded and sponsored Rosenblatt Recitals, London's only world-class series of opera recitals, inaugurated in 2000 and based between the 2012/13 season and June 2016 at Wigmore Hall. In 2013 he launched the Branscombe Festival in Devon, and was also Honorary Co-Treasurer of the Royal Philharmonic Society and a trustee of the Susan Chilcott Scholarship Fund for young singers. In 2013 Rosenblatt saved North West London's long-established Les Aldrich Music Shop from imminent closure by becoming its owner. He also supports a number of other musical causes and a variety of charities in other social and medical fields.

Early life and family
Rosenblatt was born in Liverpool to a businessman father and academic mother – sister of the well-known actors Clive Swift and David Swift – and was educated at Liverpool College and the London School of Economics and Political Science, where he studied Law. He is a member of The Law Society.

His love of the singing voice grew from his family environment. His father was one of 12 siblings from an immigrant Jewish family, several of whom were synagogue cantors. “Singing was almost a contact sport in my house,” he has said. “It was all about who could sing higher and louder. We’re talking about serious operatic trainspotting here, where a record would go on and two bars of something would be played and you had to guess the singer.” Each morning, before leaving for work, his father would play the same Decca recording of Giuseppe Verdi’s La traviata, starring Joan Sutherland, Carlo Bergonzi and Robert Merrill. The young Rosenblatt was also regularly taken by his maternal grandparents to concerts given by the Liverpool Philharmonic. On arriving in London as a student in 1977 Rosenblatt made a priority of queuing for a ticket to see Luciano Pavarotti in Verdi’s Un ballo in maschera at the Royal Opera House.

He has three grown-up children from his marriage to his late wife, Heather. In 2007 he married Emma Kane, Joint Chief Executive of International communications agency Porta Communications plc.

Career
On leaving university Ian Rosenblatt became an articled clerk at law firm Collyer Bristow, qualifying in 1983, and then joined media law firm Sheridans, where he became a partner in 1985. In 1989 he founded his own law firm in the City of London, Rosenblatt Solicitors, which has grown to over 100 staff handling business law in the UK and internationally.

One of the few full-service commercial law firms outside the 'magic circle' to hold the status of preferred lawyers to FTSE 250 clients, Rosenblatt Solicitors represents FTSE companies, listed companies, private businesses, financial institutions and leading businesspeople through teams covering Corporate, Financial Services, Employment, Real Estate, IT/IP, Tax, Regulatory and Litigation. The firm covers industry sectors such as media and entertainment, financial services, insurance, technology, construction, real estate, and infrastructure, and has handled complex and high-profile court cases in reputation management, breach of trust/breach of duty, restraint of trade, bank misselling of derivative and financial products, and insolvency/restructuring. Over a period of six years Rosenblatt Solicitors’ personal injury team represented over 1000 veterans of nuclear tests in the South Pacific in the 1950s as they strove to secure compensation from the British Government. Rosenblatt Group plc floated on the London Stock Market on 8 May 2018.

In 2000, Rosenblatt co-founded the London-based corporate and financial communications agency Redleaf Polhill; its Chief Executive is his wife, Emma Kane. The agency, which was sold to Porta Communications plc in 2014, provides media relations and/or investor relations services to over 70 client companies and organisations across a range of sectors. Rosenblatt has said that: “When I co-founded the agency I was convinced that Redleaf would really offer something quite different and that there was significant demand for a creative, tenacious and results-driven communications agency.” He has stated that he considers his decision to establish the agency as being one of his best. Emma was appointed Joint Chief Executive of Porta Communications plc, which is listed on the London Stock Exchange, in April 2018.
 
He was Honorary Co-Treasurer of the Royal Philharmonic Society ( until 2016), a charity with a declared mission of creating a vibrant future for music, and a trustee of the Susan Chilcott Scholarship Fund; commemorating the outstanding British soprano who died aged 40 in 2003, the Fund provides financial support for young classically trained singers.

Rosenblatt was appointed Officer of the Order of the British Empire (OBE) in the 2016 Birthday Honours for philanthropic services to music.

Rosenblatt Recitals
Ian Rosenblatt's decision to establish the Rosenblatt Recitals, London's only world-class series of opera recitals, was inspired in 1999, when – after the sudden withdrawal of the original sponsor – Rosenblatt Solicitors took over the sponsorship of a concert at London's Royal Festival Hall, given by the Argentinian tenor José Cura and the Philharmonia Orchestra. “It seemed to me that British audiences deserved more frequent opportunities to experience truly great voices, generally only heard at the Royal Opera House or the occasional one-off concert,” said Rosenblatt. “My plan was to present recitals by singers of international stature at regular intervals throughout the year. The programmes, each performer's own selection, would showcase vocal talent to the full.”

The Rosenblatt Recitals Series was launched at the London concert hall St John's, Smith Square on 8 December 2000 with a recital by Italian tenor Giuseppe Sabbatini, accompanied by pianist Marco Boemi. Since then, the series has presented over 100 concerts, featuring such singers as Juan Diego Flórez, Joseph Calleja, Vittorio Grigolo, Bryan Hymel, Stephen CostelloLawrence Brownlee, Saimir Pirgu, Javier Camarena, Marcello Giordani, Ailyn Pérez, Nicole Cabell, Marina Rebeka, Pretty Yende, Aida Garifullina, Giorgio Berrugi, Tomislav Mužek, Anna Caterina Antonacci, Carlos Álvarez, Quinn Kelsey and Ambrogio Maestri. The Recitals' 2015-16 season culminates with an appearance by the Italian soprano Mariella Devia, known as the 'queen of bel canto'. The series is essentially built around rising stars who have not previously given a recital in London, but it has also included such established stars as soprano June Anderson, tenor Dennis O'Neill and baritone Leo Nucci. Certain singers have also made multiple appearances in the series, among them the tenor Juan Diego Flórez: he gave his first Rosenblatt Recital in 2001 at St John's Smith Square, returning there in 2002; a further recital with piano followed in 2011, this time at the Royal Festival Hall, and 2012 brought a concert at the Royal Albert Hall with the Württembergisches Kammerorchester Heilbronn under conductor Alessandro Vitiello. Flórez returned to the Royal Albert Hall in March 2015 for a concert that also featured guest appearances by mandolinist Avi Avital and accordionist Ksenija Sidorova. Apart from special events such as these and a 2008 concert with orchestra given by tenor Joseph Calleja and soprano Tatiana Lisnic at Cadogan Hall, St John's Smith Square remained the series’ home until the end of the 2011/12 season. The opening recital of the 2012/13 season, tenor Lawrence Brownlee’s second appearance in the series, brought a move to London's Wigmore Hall, regarded as one of the world's great recital halls. The first season at Wigmore Hall resulted in a 20% rise in total audience figures and a 28% rise in average attendance per recital.

A star singer who twice failed to make a scheduled appearance in the Rosenblatt Recitals series was bass-baritone Erwin Schrott. In 2008, Rosenblatt commenced High Court proceedings against Schrott after the singer, pleading indisposition, cancelled a planned appearance in the series at short notice; he had done similarly when booked to appear in the series in 2005. The dispute was resolved in August 2008 when, at Rosenblatt's suggestion, Schrott made a donation to the charity COSMIC (Children of St Mary's Intensive Care).

June 2013 brought the announcement that four Rosenblatt Recitals from the 2012-13 season would be broadcast on Monday evenings in July and August on the Sky Arts 2 HD TV channel, presented by Suzy Klein. The four singers featured were soprano Dimitra Theodossiou and tenors Lawrence Brownlee, Joel Prieto and Antonino Siragusa.

Over the years, all concerts in the series have been recorded live and April 2013 brought the release on the Royal Opera House's Opus Arte label of three Rosenblatt Recital CDs, featuring Ailyn Pérez, Lawrence Brownlee and baritone Anthony Michaels-Moore. These were followed in October 2013 by three further releases  – recitals by the sopranos Ekaterina Siurina and Ailish Tynan (winner, in 2003, of the first Rosenblatt Recital Prize at the BBC Cardiff Singer of the World Competition, with which Rosenblatt remained associated until 2009) and tenor Francesco Meli. As of Spring 2016, Opus Arte has released 12 Rosenblatt Recital CDs, with the most recent (released early 2016) featuring sopranos Jessica Pratt and Rosa Feola and tenor Ben Johnson.

Between 2006 and 2016 the Rosenblatt Recitals series has sponsored the Singer category of the Royal Philharmonic Society's annual RPS Music Awards. The 2013 recipient was the British mezzo-soprano Sarah Connolly. The 2015 recipient was the German baritone Christian Gerhaher.

The Rosenblatt Recital Series ceased in 2017.

Branscombe Festival
At Ian Rosenblatt's instigation, the first Branscombe Festival took place in July 2013. Branscombe is a seaside village in East Devon where Rosenblatt has a second home. Announcing the festival in April 2013, Rosenblatt said: “I am delighted and excited that we have this incredible opportunity to present the world’s leading stars from opera, classical music and jazz in the intimate and beautiful setting of the village of Branscombe. I hope that this will be the first of many Branscombe Festivals.” Among the artists appearing at the festival in 2013 were soprano Ailyn Pérez and tenor Stephen Costello, who have both appeared in the Rosenblatt Recitals series in London.

The 2014 Branscombe Festival took place from Friday 25 - Sunday 27 July and included artists such as soprano Ailish Tynan, tenor Luis Gomes and vocal ensemble I Fagiolini.

The third Branscombe Festival took place in July 2015, when the seaside village played host to Francesco Meli, Angel Blue, Susan Bullock, Patricia Hammond and the Sacconi Quartet, among others.

The 2016 Branscombe Festival took place between 29–31 July and artists included soprano Serena Gamberoni, baritone Luca Salsi Miss Hope Springs and the Leo Green Experience.

Les Aldrich Music Shop
In 2013, Ian Rosenblatt became the owner of the Les Aldrich Music Shop, an independent retailer in Muswell Hill, North London. Ian Rosenblatt had been a customer at the shop for 25 years, and when the owner mentioned to him in April 2013 that he was thinking of closing the shop, Rosenblatt made a rapid decision to buy it as a going concern.  “I think people are still attracted to specialist shops where there are people who are knowledgeable about the products and where you get a personal service,” he has said. “If you want to see different options and possibly talk to somebody about, in the case of music, the best performers, the best performances ... you can’t get that on Amazon but you can get that here [Les Aldrich Music Shop].” Rosenblatt himself regularly serves in the shop on Saturdays.

Other charitable activities
In the musical field, Rosenblatt provides bursaries to the Wales International Academy of Voice, run under the directorship of tenor Dennis O’Neill CBE, and has also established the Ian Rosenblatt Bursary at the Wexford Festival in Ireland. From 2003 to 2009 he was sponsor of the Rosenblatt Recital Song Prize at the BBC Cardiff Singer of the World competition. He is also a supporter of Grange Park Opera, the Buxton Festival and the Royal Opera House, and donated towards the project to build a music wing, opened in 2011, at the Henrietta Barnett School in North-West London; pupils from the school regularly attend the Rosenblatt Recitals.

In other charitable areas, Ian Rosenblatt is an Ambassador for the RNIB and among further organisations he supports are Community Security Trust where he is a trustee, the Wiener Library and the UK Sepsis Trust (for which his stepson is an ambassador). In December 2015 the Department for Culture, Media & Sport announced that Ian Rosenblatt had been appointed by the Culture Secretary as a Trustee of National Museums Liverpool for a term of four years.

He was a donor to the Labour Party under Ed Miliband's leadership.

References

External links
 Rosenblatt Recitals
 Les Aldrich Music Shop
 Branscombe Festival

1959 births
Lawyers from Liverpool
Living people
Officers of the Order of the British Empire
People educated at Liverpool College
Labour Party (UK) donors